Jian Yang (born October 1962) is a Chinese New Zealander international relations academic, politician and a former member of the New Zealand House of Representatives. Before moving to New Zealand, he was a member of the Chinese Communist Party and worked for the People's Liberation Army, including training linguists to intercept foreign communications. He is a member of the National Party and was a National MP from 2011 until the 2020 general election, when he retired.

Several news outlets reported in 2021 that his retirement from Parliament came after intelligence agencies flagged concerns about his relationship with the Chinese Government, and was arranged as part of a deal between Prime Minister Jacinda Ardern and Opposition Leader Todd Muller that also involved Labour MP Raymond Huo leaving Parliament for the same reason.

Early life
Yang grew up in Jiangxi Province in southern China. He earned his MA and PhD in international relations from the Australian National University.

In 1999 Yang joined the University of Auckland as a Senior Lecturer in Political Studies. He was granted New Zealand citizenship on 14 June 2004.

Member of Parliament

Yang was ranked at 36 on the National Party list for the 2011 New Zealand general election. He was the highest ranked new candidate on the list and was seen as a replacement for Pansy Wong, a Chinese MP who had resigned since the previous election.

Yang was re-elected on the party list in 2014 and 2017. During his parliamentary career, Yang was the deputy chair of the Health select committee from 2013 to 2014, the chair of the Education and Science committee from 2014 to 2017 and the chair of Governance and Administration committee from 2017 to 2020. He was additionally appointed a Parliamentary Private Secretary to the Minister for Ethnic Communities in 2017 and the National Party opposition spokesperson for statistics from 2017 to 2020.

In 2019, it was reported that Yang organised a meeting between National Party leader Simon Bridges and Guo Shengkun, the head of the Chinese Communist Party secret police during a visit to China.

While he was initially re-selected as a National Party list candidate in March 2020 for that year's general election, Yang later announced his retirement from politics following renewed pressure from New Zealand First MP Winston Peters over his alleged links to Chinese military intelligence.

It was later reported that his retirement from Parliament came as the result of a secret deal between Prime Minister Jacinda Ardern and Opposition Leader Todd Muller after intelligence agencies raised concerns about his and Labour MP Raymond Huo's relationships with the Chinese Government. According to reports, the two leaders arranged for both Jian and Huo to leave Parliament at the 2020 election "with a minimum of fuss".

Foreign agent allegations

On 13 September 2017 accusations were raised in the media that Yang taught English to Chinese spies in the 1980s and 1990s. Yang admitted he had a background as a civilian, or non-ranking, officer in the Chinese military. In response to the accusations, the National Party released a copy of Yang's CV from 2012, which mentioned his time at the Air Force Engineering College and Luoyang People's Liberation Army University of Foreign Languages. The Financial Times says the Foreign Languages Institute is part of China's military intelligence apparatus run by the People's Liberation Army, training linguists to intercept foreign communications; Yang is also a graduate of this same institution. It was also reported that Yang attracted the attention of the New Zealand Security Intelligence Service three years prior to these revelations. Yang was a lecturer at the Foreign Language Institute and his immigration file shows he taught the English language and American studies. Yang claimed he taught his students to simply monitor communications, rather than carry out "the physical act of spying". He conceded he could be seen as having taught spies. The New Zealand Herald later reported that Yang did not disclose his links to the schools in his citizenship applications and instead substituted "partner" universities.

Yang also confirmed that he had been a member of the Chinese Communist Party but claimed to be inactive since moving to New Zealand in 1994.

In late June 2020, Yang came under further criticism from media and New Zealand First leader Winston Peters for refusing to give English-language interviews since the spy allegations surfaced and only granting interviews to Chinese-language media. He then announced his retirement from Parliament, reportedly as a result of a deal between Prime Minister Jacinda Ardern and Opposition Leader Todd Muller after intelligence agencies raised concerns about his and Labour MP Raymond Huo's relationships with the Chinese Government.

See also
Pierre Yang (a similar case in Australia)

References

External links
Profile on National party website

Living people
New Zealand National Party MPs
New Zealand list MPs
Academic staff of the University of Auckland
1962 births
Members of the New Zealand House of Representatives
New Zealand political philosophers
Chinese emigrants to New Zealand
21st-century New Zealand politicians
Candidates in the 2017 New Zealand general election
People's Liberation Army personnel
People with acquired New Zealand citizenship